"Embers" is a song released by British singer James Newman, on 11 March 2021. It represented the United Kingdom in the Eurovision Song Contest 2021 in Rotterdam, where it came in last place with no points. Described as a dance pop single, the song is about enduring passion, which Newman feels has resonance with the approaching end point of the COVID-19 pandemic.

In an interview on BBC radio's Newsbeat, Newman stated: "I feel like everyone wants a party and to have some fun so when I was writing, that's what I had in my head. I wanted something people can dance to, even if it's just in their kitchen." The song received mixed reviews from critics. Following the contest it reached the top forty within Lithuania, Belgium and the United Kingdom and charted in Sweden and the Netherlands. It has since been certified Platinum in Denmark.

Eurovision Song Contest 

Newman was selected to represent the United Kingdom in the Eurovision Song Contest 2020 with the song "My Last Breath", before the event was cancelled due to the COVID-19 pandemic in Europe. On 19 February 2021, the British broadcaster BBC announced that Newman was again internally selected for the 2021 contest, that will be held in Rotterdam, Netherlands.

As a member of the Big Five, the United Kingdom automatically qualified for the final on 22 May 2021. The United Kingdom was the ninth country to perform, following  and preceding .

It is also the second UK entry to receive no points in the country's history at the competition.

Reviews 
The song received mixed reviews. Roisin O'Connor of The Independent gave the song three out of five stars. O'Connor stated that "Newman delivers these lyrics in charismatic whoops – he actually sounds like a children's entertainer – so you can forgive the clichés. And anyway, as he's probably noticed, Eurovision judges are fans of a few clichés. So nice one, James. It probably won't get the coveted douze points, but it will raise more smiles than our usual efforts."

Jochan Embley of the Evening Standard also rated the song three out of five stars overall, feeling that "This feel-good dance-pop bop should be more than enough to avoid any nil points catastrophe".

Charts

Certifications

References 

2021 songs
2021 singles
BMG Rights Management singles
British dance-pop songs
Eurovision songs of 2021
Eurovision songs of the United Kingdom
Eurovision songs that scored no points
James Newman (musician) songs
Songs written by James Newman (musician)